Mécheria is a city situated in Naâma Province, Algeria in the Atlas mountains, capital of Mécheria District, known for its cold winter and livestock life.

Current President of Algeria Abdelmadjid Tebboune was born here in 1945.

Transport

Air 
Mécheria Airport is a military airport in Mécheria.

Railway 

Mecheria is served by a narrow gauge railway from Mohammadia, however, replacing it with a standard gauge line has been proposed.

Climate
In Mecheria, there is a local steppe climate. Rainfall is higher in winter than in summer. The Köppen-Geiger climate classification is BWk. About  of precipitation falls annually.

See also 

 Railway stations in Algeria

References

Communes of Naâma Province
Cities in Algeria